Luis Ricauter Jaramillo (born 25 April 1988 in Panama City, Panama) is a football midfielder who currently plays in Panama for Liga Panameña de Fútbol team Chorrillo.

Club career
Jaramillo played at Panamanian clubs Chepo, Plaza Amador and Árabe Unido both sides of a stint in Colombian second division football with Atlético La Sabana, before moving to Honduras where he had spells on loan at Victoria and Vida whom he joined in summer 2012 despite problems with his player registration.

Nicknamed Popochín, he returned to Panama to join Sporting San Miguelito ahead of the 2013 Clausura before moving to Chorrillo in summer 2013.

International career
Jaramillo played for Panama at the 2007 FIFA U-20 World Cup in Canada.

He made his senior debut for Panama in a January 2009 UNCAF Nations Cup match against Honduras and has earned a total of 4 caps, scoring no goals. He represented his country at the 2009 UNCAF Nations Cup in Honduras where Panama were champions.

His final international was a March 2010 friendly match against Venezuela.

Honors

Panama
UNCAF Nations Cup (1): 2009

References

External links

1988 births
Living people
Sportspeople from Panama City
Association football midfielders
Panamanian footballers
Panama international footballers
2009 UNCAF Nations Cup players
Copa Centroamericana-winning players
Chepo FC players
C.D. Plaza Amador players
C.D. Árabe Unido players
C.D. Victoria players
C.D.S. Vida players
Sporting San Miguelito players
Unión Deportivo Universitario players
Panamanian expatriate footballers
Expatriate footballers in Colombia
Expatriate footballers in Honduras
Liga Nacional de Fútbol Profesional de Honduras players
Panama under-20 international footballers
Panama youth international footballers